Songbird Airways, Inc., established as Sky King, was a charter airline based in Miami, Florida. As Sky King, it operated flights from Florida to Cuba on behalf of Customer Service Providers (CSPs). Sky King also conducted flights of deportees to undisclosed destinations on behalf of U.S. Immigration and Customs Enforcement (ICE). In the past, the airline provided charter service to sports teams and businesses using Boeing 737 aircraft sporting various seat configurations. The airline filed for Chapter 11 bankruptcy protection on March 9, 2010, after it was unable to meet the payment demands of one of its largest creditors, fuel supplier Mercury Air Group.

History
The airline began operations in July 1990 as a privately held company to fly for the NBA's Sacramento Kings.

Initially, the company provided service for the Kansas City Kings in a single BAC One-Eleven under FAR-125.  In 2002, Sky King received its FAR-121 certificate and 98% of the company's flying was for hockey teams.  A series of events in 2005, including the NHL lockout, the devastation of Hurricane Katrina and the spike in jet fuel prices required Sky King to find an alternate way of running its business.  This resulted in the adoption of the ACMI (Aircraft Crew Maintenance and Insurance) model and a partnership with Gold Transportation was forged.

In March 2010, Sky King filed for Chapter 11 bankruptcy protection. Sky King emerged from this Chapter 11 bankruptcy in June 2011.  Following a successful reorganization in June 2010, the airline moved its headquarters from Sacramento, California to Lakeland, Florida.  By moving to Lakeland, Sky King was able to reduce its maintenance costs (by eliminating cross-country ferry flights) and focus on expanding the east coast markets it served.  In October, 2010, Sky King was purchased by Aviation Capital Partners Group and shifted its focus away from private charters and towards providing scheduled services.  At the end of 2010, Sky King had over 270 employees.

At the end of August 2012, Sky King returned three aircraft to its owner, AerSale, in Roswell, NM. At the same time, Sky King again filed for Chapter 11 bankruptcy protection and laid off over 20 pilots, 30 flight attendants, and others in operations, maintenance, and the Lakeland office.

In December 2013, Sky King furloughed/laid off nearly half of staff across all departments and returned one airplane to the leasing company. As of December 31, 2013, Sky King had two airplanes in its fleet, one of which had been grounded for several months with a bad engine that needed to be replaced.  Also in December, the New Jersey Division of Gaming Enforcement revealed that Sky King owed $23,424.26 in taxes to New Jersey from 2009, thus prohibited from doing air charter business with Atlantic City casinos.

Sky King emerged from Chapter 11 bankruptcy on October 3, 2014 upon confirmation by the United States Bankruptcy Court of the Trustee's Plan of Reorganization. Sky King was acquired by AerLine Holdings LLC on October 24, 2014. Sky King was acquired by AerLine Holdings LLC on October 24, 2014. Service was resumed on December 22, 2014 after the United States Department of Transportation found the carrier "fit, willing and able" to resume service with up to ten aircraft.

In June 2015, the name was changed to Songbird Airways. On August 30, 2017, Songbird entered into an agreement with USGlobal Airways for purchase of Songbird's stock for $6.5 million with a closing date of October 15, 2017.

Other services

Direct Air
From March 2007 until May 2007, Sky King operated a single aircraft for Direct Air. In early 2011, Sky King teamed up again with Direct Air and flew two airplanes for the company. Depending on the season, the flying switched from Palm Beach International Airport (during summer), Myrtle Beach (during winter), Punta Gorda (during fall) and Lakeland (year round). Direct Air abruptly ceased operations on March 13, 2012.

Cuban charter service

Sky King provided charter aircraft to numerous touring agencies with flights into Cuba. Flights to Cuba originated from Miami and Tampa. The majority of the flights into Cuba were to Cienfuegos, Havana, Camaguey, Holguin, and Santiago de Cuba.

Fly Guam Service
In early spring 2011, Sky King agreed to provide ACMI service to start-up company Fly Guam, flying a single Boeing 737-400. Initially, the company operated flights out of Guam to Saipan, continuing on to Hong Kong. In the coming months, the company opened routes to Nagoya, Japan and Koror, Palau. In November 2011, Sky King's parent company Aviation Capital Partners Group purchased a 51% stake. Fly Guam ceased operations at the end of 2011.

Fleet

The airline previously operated the following the aircraft:

See also
List of defunct airlines of the United States

References

External links

Sky King aircraft

Airlines of the United States
Airlines established in 1990
Airlines disestablished in 2017
Airlines based in Florida
1990 establishments in Florida
Charter airlines of the United States
American companies established in 1990
American companies disestablished in 2017
Companies that filed for Chapter 11 bankruptcy in 2010
Companies that filed for Chapter 11 bankruptcy in 2012